Kasumo is a small settlement in Burundi, lying to the southeast of the largest city and former capital, Bujumbura. It is one of three places in Africa to claim to be the source of the Nile, being the southernmost source of any of the river's tributaries.

References
Fitzpatrick, M., Parkinson, T., & Ray, N. (2006) East Africa. Footscray, VIC: Lonely Planet.

Populated places in Burundi